St. Peter's College, Gampaha (Sinhala: සාන්ත පීතර විදුහල, Tamil: செயிண்ட் பீட்டர் கல்லூரி) is a boys-only primary to secondary (inclusive) and was a branch school of St Peter's College, Colombo. It is located in the Udugampola zone of Minuwangoda, Sri Lanka, and was founded on 2 February 1993. Even though the school is located in Gampaha district, St. Peter's College, Gampaha belongs to the Minuwangoda educational Zone.

History
The St. Peter's College branch school was the initiative of the auxiliary Bishop of Colombo, Oswald Gomis. Under the patronage of Archbishop of Colombo, Nicolas Marcus Fernando, St. Peter's College, Udugampola was founded on 2 February 1993, in the Holy Cross Church premises known as "Gal Palliya".

At its inception there were only two teachers, Deepika Peiris and Sarojini Perera, with 46 children enrolled. The first principal of the college was Thilak Rodrigo and Rev. Fr. Joe Wickramasinghe was the Rector.

On 25 October 2003, the Udugampola branch of St. Peter's College was opened by Gomis, with Rev. Fr. Felician Ranjith Perera, Rev. Fr. Siri Cooray, and principal, Mathew Bernad Fernando.

In 2012, Cardinal Malcolm Ranjith gave direction to the school management to shift the primary school in Gampaha to Udugampola. The foundation stone was laid for a four-storey building in Udugampola in order to accommodate the students. This new classroom building was opened on 23 April 2013 by Cardinal Ranjith and the Udugampola branch was renamed to St. Peter's College, Gampaha.

Houses

The primary school houses

 Gregory House

 Julian House

 Marcellous House

 Paris House

The upper school houses

Anthony House

Named after Antoine Coudert OMI, Archbishop of Colombo (1903–1928) and founding archbishop who supported St. Peter's College.

Nicholas House 

Named after D. J. Nicholas Perera OMI, President of St. Joseph's College, Colombo South (1922–1927) and first Rector of St. Peter's College, Colombo (1927–1943)

Maurice House

Named after Maurice Le Goc OMI, Rector of St. Joseph's College, Colombo (1921–1940), founder and rector(1922-1927) of St. Joseph's College Colombo South (later renamed St. Peter's College, Colombo).

Peter House 

Named after Pierre-Guillaume Marque OMI, Archbishop of Colombo (1930–1937), archbishop at the initiation of the House System.

Principals

Directors
{| class="wikitable"
|Rev. Fr. Chaminda Wanigasena 
|2012–2014
|-
|Rev. Fr. Lakmin Prasanga Silva 
|2014–2017
|-
|Rev. Fr. Jayashantha Sovis
|2018–}

References

External links
http://www.stpetersgampaha.lk
https://www.stpeterscollege.lk

Catholic schools in Sri Lanka
Catholic secondary schools in Sri Lanka
Private schools in Sri Lanka
Schools in Gampaha